The UCL Faculty of Laws is the law school of University College London (UCL), itself part of the federal University of London. It is one of UCL's 11 constituent faculties and is based in London, United Kingdom. It is one of the world's leading law schools, and ranked 6th globally in the 2022 Times Higher Education World University Rankings for Law.

Established in 1826, the Faculty was the first law school in England to admit students regardless of their religion, and the first to admit women on equal terms with men. The Faculty currently has a student body comprising around 650 undergraduates, 350 taught graduates and around 40 research (MPhil/PhD) students and offers a  variety of undergraduate and graduate degrees. It publishes a number of journals, including Current Legal Problems, Current Legal Issues, and the UCL Journal of Law and Jurisprudence.

Notable alumni of the Faculty include Mahatma Gandhi (leader of the Indian independence movement), Chaim Herzog (President of Israel 1983–1993), John Stuart Mill (philosopher and MP), Sir Ellis Clarke (President of Trinidad and Tobago 1976–1986), Lord Woolf (Lord Chief Justice of England and Wales 2000–2005), Lord Goldsmith QC (Attorney General for England and Wales 2001–2007), Terry Davis (Secretary General of the Council of Europe 2004–2009), Taslim Olawale Elias (President of the International Court of Justice 1979–1985) and Chao Hick Tin (Attorney General of Singapore 2006–2008; Judge of Appeal 1999–2006 and 2008–2017).

History

The Faculty was established in 1826 and is one of the oldest law schools in England. It was the first law school in England to offer a systematic university education to men and women, irrespective of religious beliefs and social backgrounds. The Faculty's first professor was the noted legal philosopher, John Austin (Professor of Jurisprudence). Andrew Amos, a successful barrister, became the first Professor of English Law (and later Professor of Medical Jurisprudence).

Dame Hazel Genn was appointed was dean of the Faculty from September 2008 to May 2017. The current dean is Piet Eeckhout.

In November 2010, the Faculty launched the UCL Judicial Institute, the first specialist academic centre for research and teaching about the judiciary to be established in the UK.

Building
The Faculty is based at Bentham House, Endsleigh Gardens, a few minutes' walk from the main UCL campus. The building is named after philosopher, jurist and reformer Jeremy Bentham (1748–1832), who is closely associated with UCL. The main building was originally constructed in 1954–8 as a headquarters for the National Union of General and Municipal Workers: the exterior decoration includes at fifth-floor level five relief sculptures of industrial workers by Esmond Burton. It was acquired by UCL and occupied by the Faculty in 1965. In the mid-2000s, the Faculty expanded into the adjacent 1970s building in Endsleigh Street, formerly the B'nai B'rith Hillel House (a social and residential centre for Jewish students), now renamed the Gideon Schreier Wing.

Facilities at Bentham House include teaching rooms, lecture halls, a courtroom for moots, a student lounge, a coffee bar and two computer cluster rooms.

In November 2014 an £18.5 million redevelopment of Bentham House received planning permission. Levitt Bernstein are the architects for the project.

Academics

Research

The Faculty was placed joint first in the UK for the proportion of its research activity in the top two star categories (75% 4*/3*) in the 2008 Research Assessment Exercise. It is home to a number of associated research centres, groups and institutes:

Bentham Project
Centre for Access to Justice
Centre for Commercial Law
Centre for Criminal Law
Centre for Empirical Legal Studies
Centre for Ethics & Law
Centre for International Courts & Tribunals
Centre for Law, Economics and Society
Centre for Law and the Environment
Centre for Law and Governance in Europe
Institute of Brand and Innovation Law
Institute of Global Law
Institute of Human Rights
Jevons Institute for Competition Law and Economics
Judicial Institute
Labour Rights Institute 
UCL Jurisprudence Group
UCL Private Law Group
Human Rights Beyond Borders

Teaching

Undergraduate
The Faculty reported in 2010 that it receives around 2,500 applications for approximately 140 undergraduate places each year. The minimum entry requirements are A*AA grades at A-level, plus a pass in a fourth subject at AS level and a high LNAT score. All candidates to whom an offer is contemplated being made who are identified as requiring particular consideration are interviewed. There are no places available through the UCAS clearing process.

Graduate
The Faculty admits approximately 350 students to its on campus LLM course each year, receiving an average of 2,500 applicants for admission. Further, along with Queen Mary University of London's respective law faculty it is further responsible for a joint LLM by examination awarded by the University of London at large.

The minimum entry requirements for the MPhil and PhD research degrees are a bachelor's degree with first or high upper second honours together with an LLM with an average grade of 65% (ideally with evidence of first class ability).

Publications

The Faculty publishes a number of journals, including Current Legal Problems, Current Legal Issues, and the UCL Journal of Law and Jurisprudence.

Public lectures

The Faculty hosts a number of free public lectures each week (including the Current Legal Problems series) on a wide range of legal topics. These lectures are delivered by eminent academics from major universities around the world, senior members of the judiciary and leading legal practitioners.

Rankings
The Faculty is regarded as one of the best in the UK. In 2017, UCL Laws was ranked 8th globally in the 2018 Times Higher Education World University Rankings for Law. In 2009 the Independent University Guide ranked the quality of teaching at the Faculty joint first in the UK alongside the University of Oxford. During a recent peer-review assessment conducted by The Sunday Times, the Faculty recorded perfect scores for teaching and research quality, confirming its reputation as one of UCL's most outstanding departments.

In 2009, the Faculty enjoyed a 100% graduate employment rate, compared to 99.7% at the University of Oxford, 98% at the University of Cambridge and 97% at the London School of Economics. Many graduates go on to pursue legal careers at 'Magic Circle' law firms and leading barristers' chambers.

In the 2020 Times Higher Education World University Rankings UCL is ranked 9th in the world (and 4th in Europe) for Law. In domestic rankings, UCL Laws ranks 3rd in the 2020 The Guardian University Guide, 2nd in the 2020  The Times and Sunday Times University Guide, and 2nd in the 2020 Complete University Guide.

UCL Law Society
The UCL Law Society has existed for more than 70 years and is regarded as one of the most prestigious student law societies in the UK. In 2017, the UCL Law Society was recognised as one of the top 10 university societies in the UK, and shortlisted for the 'Best Law Society' and 'Best Society for Aspiring Barristers' in the UK.

The vast majority of LLB students become members of the Law Society upon matriculation. LLM and non-law students are able to join as affiliate members.

The Law Society is led by the President and 17 other officers who are (apart from the First Year Representative) elected in March towards the end of the academic year. Election into the UCL Law Society is highly competitive and only LLB students are allowed to be nominated for positions. LLM and non-law students are not allowed to run for elections or vote. The campaigning period lasts for five days, and the voting period lasts for three days. Following a year of service, the President's name is engraved on a board in the Law Faculty.

The Law Society holds around one activity per day during the academic year and regularly hosts top judges, academics and lawyers around the world. The Law Society organises a wide range of competitions in mooting, debating, negotiation and client interviewing, and has multiple legal publications including Silk v Brief. The Law Society also provides the most comprehensive legal careers programme at UCL and is supported by a range of barristers' chambers, City and national law firms, and overseas law firms.

There is a separate LLM Society which caters solely to LLM students. The UCL Law Society and the LLM Society are independent of each other.

Notable academic staff
The Faculty has more than 50 full-time academic staff, including 29 professors, many visiting professors and distinguished judicial and other visiting academic staff. The current list of professors include:

Eric Barendt - Emeritus Professor of Media Law
Bin Cheng, Professor of Air and Space Law, Dean of the Faculty (1971–1973)
Lord Collins of Mapesbury - Professor of Law
Dame Hazel Genn - Professor of Empirical Legal Studies
Stephen Guest - Emeritus Professor of Legal Philosophy, Principal Research Associate
Baroness Hale of Richmond DBE - former President of the Supreme Court
Sir Robin Jacob - Sir Hugh Laddie Chair of Intellectual Property Law
Anthony Julius - Chair in Law and the Arts
Philippe Sands QC - Professor of Law
Scott Shapiro - Visiting Quain Professor of Law, UCL
Wiliam Twining - Quain Professor of Jurisprudence Emeritus

Visiting Professors
Winston Chu - lawyer and activist
Eileen Denza
Elizabeth Wilmshurst

Notable alumni

Judiciary

Other

Ghazi Abdul Rahman Algosaibi – Saudi Arabian Ambassador to Bahrain (1984 to 1992); Saudi Arabian Ambassador to United Kingdom and Ireland (1992–2002)
Sir John Baker QC FBA – legal historian; Downing Professor of the Laws of England, University of Cambridge
Peter Birks QC FBA – Regius Professor of Civil Law, University of Oxford
Andrew Cayley – International Co-Prosecutor, Khmer Rouge Tribunal (Extraordinary Chambers in the Courts of Cambodia)
Sir Ellis Clarke – Governor-General of Trinidad and Tobago (1973–1976); President of Trinidad and Tobago (1976–1986)
Terry Davis – Secretary General of the Council of Europe
Geoffrey Dear, Baron Dear – Her Majesty's Inspector of Constabulary (1990–1997)
Wu Ting Fang (1842–1923) – the first ethnic Chinese person to be called to the Bar in England
Shreela Flather, Baroness Flather – first Asian woman to receive a peerage
Mahatma Gandhi – Indian Nationalist and Spiritual Leader
Garry Hart, Baron Hart of Chilton – former Special Adviser to the Lord Chancellor (1998–2007)
Farrer Herschell – 19th Century Lord Chancellor
Chaim Herzog – President of Israel (1983–1993)
Michael Sfard – Israeli Human Rights Lawyer
J. B. Jeyaretnam – Singapore politician and former leader of the Workers' Party of Singapore
Sylvia Lim – Member of Parliament in Singapore and Chairman of the Workers' Party of Singapore
Digby Jones, Baron Jones of Birmingham – British politician and businessman; Minister of State for Trade
Julie Maxton – Registrar of the University of Oxford (first woman in 550 years)
JS Mill - Philosopher and Liberal MP
Leonard Sainer – Solicitor and retailer
L. J. K. Setright – Motoring author and journalist
Rabindranath Tagore (did not graduate) – Bengali poet; Nobel Prize in Literature (1913); first Asian Nobel Laureate
Carol Thatcher – Journalist, author and media personality
David Ivor Young, Baron Young of Graffham – Secretary of State for Employment (1985-1987); Secretary of State for Trade and Industry (1987-1989)
Lord Woolf – Lord Chief Justice 2000-2005
Joseph Fok - Permanent Judge of the Hong Kong Court of Final Appeal 2013–Present
Jerrold Yam - Lawyer and poet

See also
 Institute of Advanced Legal Studies
 List of University College London people in the Law

References

External links 
 UCL Faculty of Laws
 University College London

Departments of University College London
Law schools in England